Josef Hirtreiter (1 February 1909 – 27 November 1978) was an SS functionary of Nazi Germany and a Holocaust perpetrator who worked at Treblinka extermination camp during the Operation Reinhard phase of the Holocaust in Poland. Hirtreiter was arrested by the U.S. military in July 1946 and confessed to working at Treblinka. In 1951, Hirtreiter was convicted of killing 10 people, mostly children aged one or two, and sentenced to life in prison. He was released from prison in 1977 and died several months later in a home for the elderly in Frankfurt.

SS career
Hirtreiter was born in Bruchsal. After elementary school, he worked as unskilled construction worker and bricklayer. He failed the exam in lock-picking. On 1 August 1932 he became a member of the Nazi Party and Sturmabteilung (SA). After the invasion of Poland, in October 1940 he was assigned to the Hadamar Euthanasia Centre where he worked in the kitchen. In summer 1942 he joined the army. Four weeks later he was sent back to Hadamar, and then to Berlin from where Christian Wirth transferred him to Lublin reservation camp complex back in occupied Poland. There, he acquired the rank of SS-Scharführer and was shipped to Treblinka death camp. Hirtreiter served at Treblinka II from October 1942 till October 1943 at the camp-zone 2 Auffanglager receiving area. He monitored naked women, before gassing them. Later, he served at the Sobibór extermination camp.

After the closing of Treblinka in October 1943, Hirtreiter was ordered to Italy where he joined a police unit for the so-called anti-partisan "cleansing" operations. His death camp superior, Franz Stangl, went there in order to set up the Risiera di San Sabba killing centre in Trieste.

Trial and conviction
Hirtreiter was arrested by the U.S. military in July 1946 for having served at Hadamar Euthanasia Centre. American officials were unable to pin anything on Hirtreiter regarding Hadamar, but he did confess to working at a camp called Malkinia. He was sent to an internment camp in Darmstadt in September. A subsequent investigation revealed Malkinia as the Treblinka extermination camp. Unable to pin any specific atrocities on Hirtreiter, a denazification court instead sentenced him to 10 years in a labour camp as a major offender in 1948. However, in 1949, Hirtreiter was charged with murder after a West German prosecutor read about his denazification case in a newspaper article and decided to conduct an investigation. Hirtreiter was tried by a court in Frankfurt via the testimony of Treblinka prisoner Szyja (a.k.a. Sawek, or Jeszajahu) Warszawski, who survived in a burial pit wounded, and slipped away under the cover of night, and a second witness, Abraham Bomba. In March 1951, Hirtreiter was found guilty of 10 counts of murder and sentenced to life in prison with hard labour. The court ruled that he had killed at least 10 people, mostly children aged one to two, during the unloading of the transports notably, by grabbing them by their feet and smashing their heads against the walls of boxcars. Hirtreiter was released from prison in 1977 due to illness. He died several months later in a home for the elderly in Frankfurt.

References

Sources
 

1909 births
1978 deaths
Holocaust perpetrators in Poland
People convicted in the Treblinka trials
Sturmabteilung personnel
SS non-commissioned officers
Treblinka extermination camp personnel
People from Bruchsal
People from the Grand Duchy of Baden
Prisoners and detainees of the United States military
German people convicted of murder
German prisoners sentenced to life imprisonment
Prisoners sentenced to life imprisonment by Germany
Aktion T4 personnel
Sobibor extermination camp personnel